Chris Hankinson (born 30 November 1993) is a professional rugby league footballer who plays as a  for Featherstone Rovers in the Super League.

He played for the Leigh Centurions in the Championship, the Barrow Raiders in Championship 1 and League 1, and Swinton Lions and London Broncos in the Championship. Hankinson has spent time on loan from Wigan at Swinton in the Betfred Championship. He has also played for Cumbria.

Background
Hankinson was born in Wigan, Greater Manchester, England.

He is a qualified electrician and personal trainer.

Career

Early career
Hankinson played his junior at the Ashton Bears. He was in the junior systems of the Salford City Reds, but did not progress through to the first team.

Leigh Centurions
He left Salford to begin his professional career at the Leigh Centurions. He made his debut for Leigh in 2014.

He was sent on loan by the Centurions to the Barrow Raiders, playing for the Cumbrian club throughout the 2015 Championship 1 season.

Leigh sent him to the Barrow the following year, spending the entire 2016 League 1 season in Cumbria.

Swinton Lions
Hanksinson moved from Leigh to the Swinton Lions in the Championship ahead of the 2017 season.

Wigan Warriors
He moved to his hometown club in July 2018, and he made his Super League début for Wigan in the derby against St Helens.

He spent part of 2019 on loan at his former club Swinton, featuring in eight matches in the Championship.

He won a League Leaders medal with Wigan in 2020.

London Broncos
On 31 December 2020 it was announced that he had signed for the London Broncos for the 2021 season.

Toulouse Olympique
On 9 November it was announced that Hankinson had left Wigan and signed for Toulouse Olympique on a two year deal. He will become the third goal-kicker at Toulouse along-side Mark Kheirallah and Anthony Marion.

Featherstone Rovers
On 17 October 2022 it was announced that Hankinson had signed for Featherstone for the 2023 season.

Club statistics

References

External links

London Broncos profile
Wigan Warriors profile
SL profile
Swinton Lions profile
Former Barrow Raiders Chris Hankinson and Joe Bullock left stunned by Salford Red Devils' comeback against Wigan Warriors
They Played For Leigh
HANKINSON TO HIT 50 AGAINST RAMS
Wigan Warriors' Chris Hankinson taps into PT background
Tracey joins Barrow on loan from Leigh
Barrow Raiders old boy Chris Hankinson back in as Wigan Warriors thump Huddersfield Giants

1993 births
Living people
Barrow Raiders players
Cumbria rugby league team players
Featherstone Rovers players
Leigh Leopards players
London Broncos players
Rugby league centres
Rugby league players from Wigan
Swinton Lions players
Toulouse Olympique players
Wigan Warriors players